is a Japanese footballer currently playing as a defensive midfielder for Kashiwa Reysol.

Career statistics

Club
.

Notes

References

1999 births
Living people
Association football people from Saitama Prefecture
University of Tsukuba alumni
Japanese footballers
Association football midfielders
Kashiwa Reysol players